Hilbert basis may refer to
 In Invariant theory, a finite set of invariant polynomials, such that every invariant polynomial may be written as a polynomial function of these basis elements 
 Orthonormal basis of a Hilbert space
 Hilbert basis (linear programming)
 Hilbert's basis theorem